The Thomas C. Carson House is a historic building located in Iowa City, Iowa, United States. It is currently in use as the sorority house of the University of Iowa chapter of Alpha Phi, and is thus also known as the Carson-Alpha Phi House.

Carson was one of the passengers on the first train to enter Iowa City.  He went to become a prominent merchant and banker in the community, and was involved with the local utility companies that his sons controlled.  He had this house built in 1875 in Second Empire style. The three-story frame house features a mansard roof with a concave slope, and elaborate dormers.  It was individually listed on the National Register of Historic Places in 1982.  In 1997 it was included as a contributing property in the College Green Historic District.

References

Houses completed in 1875
Second Empire architecture in Iowa
Houses in Iowa City, Iowa
National Register of Historic Places in Iowa City, Iowa
Houses on the National Register of Historic Places in Iowa
Individually listed contributing properties to historic districts on the National Register in Iowa
University of Iowa campus
1875 establishments in Iowa
Sorority houses
History of women in Iowa